Jenna Cato Bass (born 1986) is a South African film director, photographer and writer. She has written stort stories under the name Constance Myburgh, one of which was shortlisted for the 2012 Caine Prize.

Early life
Bass was born in London, England and grew up in South Africa. She practiced magic at the College of Magic. She went onto graduate from the Cape Town campus of AFDA, The School for the Creative Economy.

Career
In 2011 Bass founded Jungle Jim, a genre fiction magazine. Issue 6 featured her noir detective story 'Hunter Emmanuel', featuring an investigation into a dismembered prostitute. The story was shortlisted for the Caine Prize for African Writing in 2012.

Bass's first feature film, Love the One You Love, was shot on a 'nano-budget' using hand-held consumer cameras and a partly improvised script. The film told the story of a sex phone operator negotiating her relationship with her boyfriend and considering a move to Korea. The film won Best South African Feature Film at the 2014 Durban International Film Festival.

High Fantasy (2017) was a satirical thriller about a group of young travellers who mysteriously exchange their bodies on a camping trip. Once again shot on iPhones using improvisation, the film explored "the messy tangle of race, class and gender identity in modern-day South Africa."

Flatland (2019), an all-female "South African kitsch-western genre mashup", was shot on a larger budget. It was chosen as the opening film in the 2019 Berlinale Panorama.

Works

Short stories
 (as Constance Myburgh) 'A Hole in the Ground', Jungle Jim, No. 2
 (as Constance Myburgh) 'Hunter Emmanuel, Jungle Jim, No. 6

Filmography

References

External links
 
 Geoff Ryman, Constance Myburgh a.k.a. Jenna Bass, Strange Horizons'', 2017.

1986 births
Living people
English emigrants to South Africa
Female magicians
South African short story writers
South African screenwriters
South African film directors
South African women film directors
South African photographers
South African women photographers